Colemaniella is a monotypic genus of worms belonging to the family Lineidae. The only species is Colemaniella albulus.

The species is found in Australia.

References

Lineidae
Invertebrates of Australia
Animals described in 1981